Torbeck is a commune in the Les Cayes Arrondissement, in the Sud department of Haiti. It has 69,189 inhabitants.

Settlements

References

Populated places in Sud (department)
Communes of Haiti